John Howard Sampson, M.D., Ph.D, M.B.A, M.H.S.c, is the former chief of the department of neurosurgery at Duke University where he serves as a professor of surgery, biomedical engineering, immunology, and pathology.

Education
 B.Sc, University of Manitoba 1986
 MD, University of Manitoba Faculty of Medicine, 1990
 PhD, Neuro-Oncology, Duke University Medical Center, 1994-1996
 Residency: Neurosurgery, Duke University Medical Center, 1991-1998
 Fellowship: Neurological Intensive Care, Duke University Medical Center, 1998
 MHSc, Duke University, 2007
 MBA, Duke University Fuqua School of Business, 2011

Work and research
Sampson has written a variety of papers, including a paper in Nature on his clinical trial on the treatment of glioblastoma patients and another in how tetanus toxoid and CCL3 improve dendritic cell vaccines in mice and glioblastoma patients.

Clinical interests
Newly diagnosed or recurrent primary or metastic brain tumors, including enrollment in clinical trials of new therapeutic agents (especially oncolytic poliovirus therapy, immunotherapy, vaccines and convection-enhanced delivery); posterior fossa tumors, such as acoustic neuromas or meningiomas; microsurgery for tic douloureux or trigeminal neuralgia, including microvascular decompression; microvascular decompression for hemifacial spasm, pituitary tumors, complex skull-base tumors; radiosurgery; evaluation and surgery for patients with the full spectrum of other neurosurgery pathologies.

Media
John Sampson has appeared on 60 Minutes and many other news networks for his work with glioblastoma cancer treatments.

References

Living people
American neurosurgeons
Duke University faculty
Year of birth missing (living people)
Members of the National Academy of Medicine